Nezha is a protection deity in Chinese folk religion.

Nezha or Ne Zha may also refer to:

 Nezha (given name), a feminine given name of Arabic origin, meaning virtuousness or a promenade
 Nezha (2014 film), a Chinese period drama film 
 Ne Zha (2019 film), a Chinese animated fantasy film
 Laura Nezha (born 1990), Albanian singer, actress, and director
 Neta (car marque), also called Nezha, an automotive brand of Hozon Auto

See also